Marie Marguerite de Valois (1444–1473) was the Illegitimate daughter of King Charles VII of France and his mistress Agnès Sorel.

She had two sisters, Charlotte de Valois (1446–1477) and Jeanne de Valois (born 1448).

Marie married Olivier de Coétivy, Count of Taillebourg.

References

Sources

House of Valois
1436 births
1473 deaths
Illegitimate children of French monarchs
15th-century French people
15th-century French women
Daughters of kings